The 2005–06 Australian Figure Skating Championships was held in Perth from 20 through 27 August 2005. Skaters competed in the disciplines of men's singles, ladies' singles, pair skating, ice dancing, and synchronized skating across many levels, including senior, junior, novice, adult, and the pre-novice disciplines of primary and intermediate.

Senior results

Men

Ladies

Pairs

Ice dancing

Synchronized

External links
 2005–06 Australian Figure Skating Championships results

2005 in figure skating
2006 in figure skating
Fig
Fig
Australian Figure Skating Championships